The deputy director of the CIA for operations is a senior United States government official in the U.S. Central Intelligence Agency who serves as head of the Directorate of Operations. The position was established December 1, 1950 and from January 4, 1951, until March 1, 1973, it was known as Deputy Director of Plans (DDP). When this unit was known as the Directorate of Plans, it at first accounted for about 75% of the CIA budget and about 60% of the personnel within the CIA.

After staying named the deputy director of plans until 1973, the position was then known as Deputy Director for Operations (DDO) until October 13, 2005, when, under the Intelligence Reform and Terrorism Prevention Act of 2004, the position was renamed to Director of the National Clandestine Service (D/NCS). When David Marlowe was chosen to lead the Directorate of Operations by CIA Director William J. Burns in June 2021, media reported his position as being titled Deputy Director of Operations.

Sources

 CIA's senior management structure, letter dated July 2, 1991 from William H. Webster, Director of Central Intelligence to U.S. Senator John Glenn, Select Senate Committee on Intelligence.
 "CIA plans riskier, more aggressive espionage," USA Today, November 17, 2004.
 Director Leon E. Panetta Announces New National Clandestine Service Chief, press release dated July 21, 2010.

Central Intelligence Agency
Information sensitivity